The 1978 Italian Indoor Open, also known as the Bologna Open or Bologna WCT, was a men's tennis tournament played on indoor carpet courts that was part of the 1978 Colgate-Palmolive Grand Prix circuit and took place  in Bologna, Italy. It was the fourth edition of the tournament and was held from 20 November through 26 November 1978. Fifth-seeded Peter Fleming won the singles title and earned $8,600 first prize money.

Finals

Singles
 Peter Fleming defeated  Adriano Panatta 6–2, 7–6(7–5)
 It was Fleming's only singles title of the year and the first of his career.

Doubles
 Peter Fleming /  John McEnroe defeated  Jean-Louis Haillet /  Antonio Zugarelli 6–1, 6–4

References

External links
 ATP tournament profile
 ITF tournament edition details

Italian Indoor Open
Italian Indoor Open
Italian Indoor Open
November 1978 sports events in Europe